Paralebedella estherae is a moth in the family Cossidae. It is found in Tanzania and Uganda. The habitat consists of submontane forests.

The length of the forewings is about 10.5 mm. The forewings are dark olive-buff, reticulated with olive-brown. The hindwings are deep olive-buff, reticulated with olive-brown. The colour is orange-pink along the inner margin and opposite of the abdomen.

Etymology
The species is named for Dr Esther Kioko.

References

Natural History Museum Lepidoptera generic names catalog

Metarbelinae
Moths described in 2008